Richard Connolly may refer to:

 Richard Connolly (composer) (1927–2022), Australian musician, composer and former broadcaster for the Australian Broadcasting Corporation
 Richard Connolly (monk) (1873–1948), monk of Downside Abbey, England
 Richard B. Connolly (1810–1880), American politician from New York

See also
 Richard L. Conolly (1892–1962), United States Navy admiral